Roman Povazhny (Russian: Поважный, Роман Александрович; born October 23, 1976) is a Russian-Polish former international motorcycle speedway rider. He gained Polish citizenship in 2004 and retired in 2013.

Speedway Grand Prix results

Career details

World Championships 
 Individual World Championship (Speedway Grand Prix)
 2003 - 29th place (6 points in 2 GPs)
 2005 - 25th place (4 points in 1 GP)
 Individual Under-21 World Championship
 1997 -  Mšeno - 4th place (10 points)
 Team World Championship (Speedway World Team Cup and Speedway World Cup)
 1993 - started in Group B only (4 points)
 1997 -  Piła - 6th place (7 points)
 1998 - 3rd place in Group A (12 points)
 2000 - 3rd place in Quarter-Final 1 (13 points)
 2001 - 8th place (5 points in Race-Off)
 2002 - 9th place (8 points in Event 3)
 2003 - 8th place (8 points in Race-Off)
 2007 - started in Qualifying Round 2 only (12 points)Note: In 1993 he started for Slovenia

 European Championships 
 Individual European Championship
 2001 -  Heusden Zolder - 7th place (8 points)
 2002 -  Rybnik - 6th place (9 points)
 European Pairs Championship
 2008 -  Natschbach-Loipersbach - Bronze medal (8 points)
 European Club Champions' Cup
 1998 - started in Group A only (15 points) 2004 -  Ljubljana - Silver medal for Mega-Lada Togliatti (16 points)
 2009 -  Toruń - 3rd place (5 pts) Vladivostok

 Domestic competitions 
 Individual Polish Championship
 2008 - 6th place in Semi-Final 2''
 Polish Golden Helmet
 2008 -  Wrocław - 5th place (8 points)

See also 
 Russia national speedway team
 Poland national speedway team
 List of Speedway Grand Prix riders
 Speedway in Poland

References

External links 
 (ru) Riders of Mega-Lada

1976 births
Living people
Russian speedway riders
Polish speedway riders
Naturalized citizens of Poland
Russian emigrants to Poland
Place of birth missing (living people)
Oxford Cheetahs riders